In neuroanatomy, the dorsal column nuclei are a pair of nuclei in the dorsal columns in the brainstem. The name refers collectively to the cuneate nucleus and gracile nucleus, which are present at the bottom of the medulla oblongata. Both nuclei contain second-order neurons of the dorsal column–medial lemniscus pathway, which carries fine touch and proprioceptive information from the body to the brain. Fibres reach the thalamus.

Structure

Nerve pathways 
The dorsal column nuclei each have an associated nerve tract in the spinal cord, the gracile fasciculus and the cuneate fasciculus. Both dorsal column nuclei contain synapses from afferent nerve fibers that have travelled in the spinal cord. They then send on second-order neurons of the dorsal column–medial lemniscal pathway.

Neurons of the dorsal column nuclei eventually reach the midbrain and the thalamus. They send axons that form the internal arcuate fibers. These cross over at the sensory decussation to form the medial lemniscus. They then synapse with third-order neurons of the thalamus.

Nuclei 

The major nuclei are the cuneate nucleus and gracile nucleus. These are present at the bottom of the medulla oblongata.

Gracile nucleus 
The gracile nucleus is medial to the cuneate nucleus. Its neurons receive afferent input from dorsal root ganglia sensory neurons of the lower torso and the lower limbs. The gracile nucleus and gracile fasciculus carry epicritic, kinesthetic, and conscious proprioceptive information from the lower part of the body (below the level of T6 in the spinal cord). Because of the large population of neurons in the gracile nucleus they give rise to a raised area called the gracile tubercle on the posterior side of the closed medulla at the floor of the fourth ventricle.

Cuneate nucleus 
The cuneate nucleus is lateral to the gracile nucleus. It carries the same type of information, but from the upper body and the upper limbs (except the face, which is carried by the principal sensory nucleus of trigeminal nerve). The cuneate nucleus is wedge-shaped and located in the closed part of the medulla. It lies lateral to the gracile nucleus and medial to the spinal trigeminal nucleus in the medulla. The large number of neurons found there give rise to the cuneate tubercle seen on viewing the posterior aspect of the medulla on the side of the brainstem.

Function 
The dorsal column nuclei help to carry fine touch and proprioceptive information from the body to the brain. The gracile nucleus carries information from the lower torso and the lower limbs. The cuneate nucleus carries information from the upper body and the upper limbs.

Clinical significance 
The dorsal column nuclei may degenerate during ageing, although evidence for this is not conclusive. This may reduce the sensitivity of touch and proprioception.

Other animals 
In some other animals, a third nucleus is present, known as the median accessory nucleus. This may carry information from the tail.

Additional images

References 

Brainstem